Carex subspathacea, called Hoppner's sedge, is a species of flowering plant in the genus Carex, native to coastal salt marshes of the Arctic and northwest Pacific Oceans; Alaska, Canada, Greenland, Iceland, Norway, northern and far eastern Russia, Korea, and Japan. It is grazed by snow geese (Anser caerulescens).

References

subspathacea
Plants described in 1816